Johann Nicolaus Mempel (variants: Nikolaus, Mempell, Mämpel) (10 December 1713 – 26 February 1747) was a German musician.

He was born in Heyda (now part of Ilmenau, Thuringia). From 1740 to his death, he was cantor in Apolda. Along with Johann Gottlieb Preller, he copied one of the most important manuscript collections of the organ and keyboard music of Johann Sebastian Bach, known as the Mempell-Preller-Handschrift.

He may have come into contact with Bach's music when he was a student of Johann Peter Kellner or through Johann Gottfried Walther, though it is not known for certain.

Further reading 
 Hans Löffler: Bachs Schüler in Thüringen, in J. S. Bach in Thüringen (Weimar 1950)

1713 births
1747 deaths
People from Ilmenau
People from Saxe-Weimar
German classical organists
German male organists
German classical pianists
Male classical pianists
German Baroque composers
18th-century classical composers
18th-century keyboardists
German classical composers
German male classical composers
18th-century German composers
18th-century male musicians
German pianists
German male pianists
Male classical organists